Maestro Dobel Tequila is a Mexican brand of blended tequila owned by the Beckmann Family, who also own the Jose Cuervo tequila brand.  Maestro Dobel is distributed by Proximo Spirits.

History and description
Dobel was created by and named after Juan Domingo Beckmann Legorreta (Dobel being an acronym formed by the first syllables of Domingo Beckmann Legorreta). Beckmann was the eleventh-generation leader of Jose Cuervo tequilas, in collaboration with master distillers ("Maestros") Marco Anguiano and Luis Yerenas. It was introduced in 2008.

Dobel is a blend of reposado, añejo and extra añejo tequilas, aged one, two and three years, respectively, in European white oak barrels, and then filtered to remove all color. The tequilas in the blend are distilled from 100% blue agave from a single estate in Jalisco, Mexico. Technically considered a reposado, it is the first ever multi-aged clear tequila.

The original bottle had a crystal cut glass design with a thick metallic base. The current bottle is modeled after a 19th-century laboratory bottle.

Maestro Dobel Tequilas

Maestro Dobel 50 Cristalino
A smooth, yet complex deluxe extra-añejo cristalino that commemorates Dobel's 50th anniversary.

Maestro Dobel Pavito
A first-of-its-kind tequila to use pechuga, or turkey breast, to enhance and elevate the category.

Maestro Dobel Humito
A tequila that uses mesquite wood to replicate flavors from tequilas from the 1600s, having a balance between smoky notes and agave.

Maestro Dobel Diamante
Made with 100% pure agave and formulated using a blend of Extra-Añejo, Añejo and Reposado tequilas.  It is the first ever multi-aged clear tequila.

Maestro Dobel Blanco
Bright and clear with silver touches that comes from high-quality agave with a mixture of essences that range from sweet , like caramel, honey, and maple, to nutty, with notes of vanilla.

Maestro Dobel Añejo
Aged in select white oak barrels that have been roasted to accentuate the aromas and flavors they impart.

Maestro Dobel Reposado
Aged for six months in select new American white oak barrels that have been carefully chosen and roasted to accentuate aromas and flavors.

Ratings
In 2009, Bloomberg Businessweek named Dobel one of the world's 20 best tasting tequilas, stating that it "has the depth and character of the aged spirit without the color." Wine Enthusiast rated it a 93 in 2011, and it won gold medals at the 2011 and 2013 San Francisco World Spirits competitions, and a silver in 2010.

Marketing
Ad campaigns for the tequila feature musician Perry Farrell, and Dobel has been a sponsor at the Lollapalooza music festival in Chicago, Illinois.

References

External links
 Official website

Tequila
Alcoholic drink brands
Drink companies of Mexico